Sainte-Adresse is a commune in the Seine-Maritime department in the region of Normandy, France.

Geography
The English Channel forms the western border of the commune.

Climate

Sainte-Adresse has a oceanic climate (Köppen climate classification Cfb).

Heraldry

Population

History

The oldest known name of the commune was "Caput Caleti" mentioned in 1240. Later known as Saint-Denis-Chef-de-Caux, named after an ancient place of worship and its position on the cape. In 1415, Henry V landed with his fleet, to claim the throne of France.

Starting in 1905, Georges Dufayel, a Parisian businessman, created a residential seaside resort known as Nice havrais (the "Nice of Le Havre"), at Sainte Adresse. The local architect Ernest Daniel directed operations. The Avenue de Regatta on the waterfront is designed in the image of the promenade des Anglais in Nice.

During World War I, Sainte-Adresse was the administrative capital of Belgium. The Belgian government in exile was installed from October 1914 to November 1918 in the Dufayel building, named after the businessman who had built it in 1911. It had at its disposal a post office using Belgian postage stamps.

During World War II, the Germans built several fortifications here for the Atlantic Wall, to defend the port of Le Havre.

Places of interest

 The church of St. Denis, dating from the nineteenth century.
 The de la Hève lighthouse
 A fifteenth-century manorhouse
 The chapel of Notre-Dame-des-Flots built in 1857
 The Pain de sucre, a mausoleum in memory of General Charles Lefebvre-Desnouëttes by his widow Stephanie Rollier, a cousin of Napoleon.
 The villa of Sarah Bernhardt

Paintings

Claude Monet, La pointe de la Hève, Sainte-Adresse, 1864, National Gallery, London
Claude Monet, La Pointe de la Hève à marée basse, 1865, 90.2 x 150.5 cm, Kimbell Art Museum, Fort Worth, Texas, États-Unis.
Claude Monet, Jardin à Sainte-Adresse, 1867, 98.1 cm x 129.9 cm, Metropolitan Museum of Art, New York.
Claude Monet, La plage de Sainte-Adresse, 1867, Art Institute of Chicago
Claude Monet, La côte de Sainte-Adresse
Claude Monet, La mer à Sainte-Adresse
Claude Monet, Promenade sur les falaises de Sainte-Adresse
Claude Monet, Régates à Sainte-Adresse, 1867, Metropolitan Museum of Art, New York.
Claude Monet, Les cabanes à Sainte-Adresse, 1868
Claude Monet, Rue à Sainte-Adresse
Claude Monet, La falaise de Sainte-Adresse
Claude Monet, Sainte-Adresse, bateau à voile échoué
Claude Monet, Sainte-Adresse
Claude Monet, Sainte-Adresse, bateaux de pêche sur le rivage
Jean-Baptiste-Camille Corot, Maison de pêcheurs à Sainte-Adresse, entre 1830 et 1840, Musée du Louvre, Paris
Raoul Dufy, La plage de Sainte Adresse, 1902
Alfred Stevens, La Villa des Falaises à Sainte-Adresse, 1884

People
 Flavien Belson, footballer
 Fanny Dombre-Coste, politician
 Claudine Loquen (1965-), French painter
 Sarah Bernhardt, actress, built a property here in the late nineteenth century.
 Caroline Ducey, actress, born to a marine pilot and a science teacher here in 1977
 Georges Dufayel, Parisian businessman who built the "Nice havrais" resort and the building that still bears his name.
 Henri de Gaulle and his wife Jeanne, parents of Charles de Gaulle, are buried here.
 Alphonse Karr, director of Figaro, launches the first resort in 1841.
 Prosper Mérimée located the action of his story at Sainte-Adresse.
 Claude Monet has painted numerous paintings of the city

See also
Communes of the Seine-Maritime department

References

External links

Official town website 
The strange World War I tale of Belgium in Normandy (and how a government infuriated its king)

Communes of Seine-Maritime